Willie's Fatal Visit is Child ballad 255.

Synopsis

A woman asks after her mother, her father, her brother John, and her true love Willie.  Only Willie was nearby.  He came to her at night, and she took him to bed, telling the cock not to crow until daylight.  It crows earlier, and she takes the moonlight for dawn.  Willie goes.  He meets a ghost along the way.  By a church, she tells him that he traveled in sin and said no prayers; then she kills him, tearing his body asunder.

Origins 
A version of this ballad was published in Peter Buchan's Ancient Ballads and Songs of the North of Scotland. Francis James Child believed that the first part of the ballad was a medley of Sweet William's Ghost (Child ballad 77), Clerk Saunders (Child ballad 69) and The Grey Cock (Child ballad 248).

See also
List of the Child Ballads

References 

Scottish folk songs
Songs about death
Songs about ghosts
Child Ballads
Murder ballads
Year of song unknown
Songwriter unknown